The Girl Who Invented Kissing is a 2017 American romantic drama film written and directed by Tom Sierchio and starring Vincent Piazza, Dash Mihok, Suki Waterhouse, Luke Wilson and Abbie Cornish.  It is Sierchio's directorial debut.

Cast
Vincent Piazza as Jimmy
Dash Mihok as Victor
Suki Waterhouse as The Girl
Abbie Cornish as Patti
Luke Wilson as Leo
Corey Large as Nolan
Johnny Messner as Freddy
Michael Buscemi as Phil
Brooke Hoover as Irene
David Hennessey as Brady

Reception
It won four awards: best feature film, best director (Tom Sierchio), best actor (Dash Mihok) and best supporting actor (Vincent Piazza) at the Golden Door Film Festival in 2017.

References

External links
 
 

American romantic drama films
2017 directorial debut films
2010s English-language films
2010s American films